Space Chickens in Space is a science fiction-comedy animated television series created by José C. García de Letona and Rita Street and developed by Tommy and Markus Vad Flaaten, Alan Keane, Shane Perez, and Scott Sonneborn for 9Go! and Disney XD. The series was produced by Ánima Estudios, Studio Moshi, Gingerbread Animation, and distributed by Cake Entertainment, with the participation of Disney EMEA.

Plot
Chuck, Starley, and Finley are taken from their home and mistakenly enrolled in an elite intergalactic former military academy. It would take all their strength, and teamwork, to survive every escapade they have.

Characters

Main
 Chuck (voiced by David Menkin) is a male tall chicken who is the leader of the chicken siblings. He is cool, daring, and wacky. He can be selfish and stubborn when it comes to challenges, but he is a true softie when it comes to his siblings. In Rebel to the Beak, it was revealed that he is allergic to Monstonuts and In The Good, The Bad, and The Clucky, it was also revealed that he used to be one of the Scouts from Slurp, a little cowboys camp along with Finley, Ainta and Hugo. He is the youngest of the three.
 Finley (voiced by Nick Mohammed and Dash Kruck) is a male short chicken who is the brains of the chicken siblings. He is smart, inquisitive, and mostly calm-mannered. But he can become short-tempered when no one (especially his brother and sister) describes his ideas as good ideas. İn The Good, The Bad, and The Clucky, it was revealed that he used to be one of the Scouts from Slurp, a little cowboys camp along with Chuck, Ainta, and Hugo. He is the oldest of the three.
 Starley (voiced by Laura Aikman) is a female chicken who is the loving one of the siblings. Being the middle sister, Starley always looks after her brothers and defends them no matter what. She also has born super-strength. In Sweet little Puff-Cloud, it was revealed that Starley has won the Cuddlebug contest when she was a chick.

Recurring
 Glargg (voiced by Roger Gregg and Damien Garvey) is a Green Alien.
 Niven (voiced by Lynette Callaghan) is a Female Blue Alien.

Production
Space Chickens in Space is fully animated in-house at Studio Moshi (Australia) using their bespoke hybrid Harmony animation pipeline, incorporating a mixture of hand-drawn and rigged high-quality animation. Studio Moshi provided animation direction, design (original production-ready characters and original world development), storyboard supervision & artwork, hand-crafted digital animation, visual FX.

Release
The series premiered on 9Go! in Australia on September 30, 2018, on 2x2 TV Channel in Russia on January 1, 2020, and had its Disney XD premiere in Europe, Middle-East and Africa on 19 November 2018. In April 2022, all episodes and shorts were made available on Disney+.

Episodes

References

External links
 

2010s Australian animated television series
2018 Australian television series debuts
2018 Mexican television series debuts
2010s Mexican television series
2018 British television series debuts
2010s British animated television series
2010s Irish television series
2018 Irish television series debuts
Australian children's animated space adventure television series
Australian children's animated comic science fiction television series
Australian children's animated television series
Australian flash animated television series
British children's animated space adventure television series
British children's animated comic science fiction television series
British flash animated television series
Irish children's animated space adventure television series
Irish children's animated comic science fiction television series
Mexican children's animated space adventure television series
Mexican children's animated comic science fiction television series
English-language television shows
Disney XD original programming
9Go! original programming
Disney animated television series
Ánima Estudios television series
Television series about chickens